Gujjarwal Ludhiana' is a village located in the Ludhiana West tehsil, of Ludhiana district, Punjab.

Administration
The village is administrated by a Sarpanch who is an elected representative of village as per constitution of India and Panchayati raj (India).

Villages in Ludhiana West Tehsil

Air travel connectivity
The closest airport to the village is Sahnewal Airport.

Notable people
Dr. Neelam Grewal - Member Punjab Public Service Commission, Patiala. Former Dean, Post Graduate Studies, Punjab Agricultural University, Ludhiana and former Director, Central Institute for Women in Agriculture, Bhubaneswar. Amarjit Singh Grewal - Director Of Jalandhar  Doordarshan Kendra. LtCol Deepinder Singh Grewal US Airforce

External links
 Villages in Ludhiana West Tehsil

References

Villages in Ludhiana West tehsil